The Syria women's national under-18 basketball team is a national basketball team of Syria, administered by the Syrian Basketball Federation.
It represents the country in international under-18 (under age 18) women's basketball competitions.

Current squad
Current roster for the 2018 FIBA Asia Under-18 Championship for Women Division B:

Head Coach: Abdullah Kammouneh

Assistant Coach: Carla Maghamez

 # 2 Stefany Attrash
 # 4 Dalaa Hammoud
 # 5 Rawaa Alhaj-Ali
 # 6 Yana Afif
 # 7 Noura Bshara
 # 8 Jessica Dmian
 # 9 Nelly Tarzi
 # 11 Julnar Mubarak 
 # 13 Cedra Allaw
 # 15 Yara Suleimam
 # 88 Anna Aghanian-Aslanian
 # 99 Sham Otabachi

Competition record

FIBA Asia Under-18 Championship for Women
2010: 11th
2018 (Division B):

See also
Syria women's national basketball team
Syria men's national under-19 basketball team
Syria women's national under-16 basketball team

References

External links
Archived records of Syria team participations

u18
Women's national under-18 basketball teams